Watson is an unincorporated community in Loudoun County, Virginia.

Watson is a populated place located in Loudoun County at latitude 38.993 and longitude -77.596.

The elevation is 384 feet. Watson appears on the Arcola U.S. Geological Survey Map. Loudoun County is in the Eastern Time Zone (UTC -5 hours).

Unincorporated communities in Loudoun County, Virginia
Washington metropolitan area
Unincorporated communities in Virginia